Caroline Stanbury (born April 28, 1976) is a British businesswoman and reality television personality. She is best known for appearing as an original main cast member on Bravo's reality television series Ladies of London from 2014 until 2017 and The Real Housewives of Dubai since its premiere in 2022.

Career 
Stanbury joined the cast of Ladies of London in 2014. She returned for the second and third season until it was cancelled in 2017 following her move to Dubai. In 2022, Stanbury was announced to be part of the first season of The Real Housewives of Dubai along with Nina Ali, Chanel Ayan, Caroline Brooks, Dr. Sara Al Madani and Lesa Milan. It premiered on 1 June 2022.

Before joining Ladies of London, Stanbury started her own business named "Gift Library". It was a store that sold luxury, "swanky" gifts.  However during her time on Ladies of London, she had to close down her business, where it was subsequently sold to Amara.com. Stanbury has also launched a shoe line named "Black Suede Studio". In 2020, Stanbury started the podcast "Divorced Not Dead", where she talks about her life and relationships.

Personal life 
Stanbury attended the Westonbirt School followed by King's College London. In 2004, she married banker Cem Habib. They have three children together. In 2016, Stanbury moved to Dubai, United Arab Emirates following a job offer her husband received. After 15 years of marriage, Stanbury and Habib announced their separation from one another after spending Christmas as a family. In 2021, she married Spanish footballer Sergio Carrallo. She legally got married in Mauritius due to the UAE not recognising interfaith marriages, however this law changed around the same time, but held her ceremony in Dubai.

Filmography

References

External links 

1976 births
Living people
Actresses from London
Businesspeople from London
English expatriates in the United Arab Emirates
English film actresses
English television actresses
English television personalities
Television personalities from London
The Real Housewives cast members